WINZ may refer to:

 WINZ (AM), a radio station in Miami, Florida 
 WZTU, an FM radio station in Miami, Florida, formerly known as WINZ-FM
 Department of Work and Income, formerly known as Work and Income New Zealand (WINZ), an agency within the Ministry of Social Development (New Zealand)
 Victor Winz, a professional chess player

See also
 WINS (disambiguation)
 Winze, a type of mining shaft